Bernhard Friedmann (8 April 1932 – 18 May 2021) was a German economist and politician of the Christian Democratic Union of Germany. 

Friedmann was born in Ottersweier. He served as Member of Parliament (the Bundestag) from 1976 to 1990 and as member (1990–2001) and President (1996–1999) of the European Court of Auditors. He was also President of Studienzentrum Weikersheim (2005–2008).

Honours
He was appointed honorary Professor of European Political Science at the University of Freiburg in 1995, and was awarded an honorary doctorate by the University of Sibiu (Hermannstadt) in Romania in 1997. He became an honorary citizen of his hometown of Ottersweier in 2002. He received the Euronatur-Umweltpreis environmental prize in 1997.

Publications 
 Einheit statt Raketen – Thesen zur Wiedervereinigung Deutschlands als Sicherheitskonzept. Busse und Seewald 1987, 
 Unternehmen Osteuropa – eine Herausforderung für die Europäische Gemeinschaft. Zur Notwendigkeit einer EG-Ostpolitik. Nomos 1994, zusammen mit Christa Randzio-Plath
 Evaluierungsansätze zu ausgewählten Politikbereichen der Europäischen Union. Europa-Union Bonn 2001,

References

External links 
 
 Website of Bernhard Friedmann

1932 births
2021 deaths
Members of the Bundestag for Baden-Württemberg
Officers Crosses of the Order of Merit of the Federal Republic of Germany
Members of the Bundestag for the Christian Democratic Union of Germany
Members of the Bundestag 1987–1990
Members of the Bundestag 1983–1987
Members of the Bundestag 1980–1983
Members of the Bundestag 1976–1980
People from Rastatt (district)